Cliviger is a civil parish in the borough of Burnley, Lancashire, England.  The parish contains 22 listed buildings that are recorded in the National Heritage List for England.  Of these, two are listed at Grade II*, the middle grade, and the others are at Grade II, the lowest grade.  Apart from small settlements, the parish is rural, and most of the listed buildings are or have been farmhouses, farm buildings, and associated structures.  Also in the parish are large houses, a parish church, the base of a cross, a public house, two war memorials, and two boundary stones.


Key

Buildings

References

Citations

Sources

Lists of listed buildings in Lancashire
Buildings and structures in Burnley